Jean-Daniel Flaysakier, born Jean-Daniel Flajszakier (23 September 1951 – 7 October 2021) was a French doctor and journalist.

Biography
Born as Jean-Daniel Flajszakier, he francisized his name to Flaysakier. He earned a degree in medicine from the University of Tours and worked on the team which developed the first hepatitis B vaccine. He then earned a master's degree in epidemiology from Harvard University. Upon his return to France, he worked for written press, radio, and television.

From 1985 to 1991, Flaysakier was a health columnist on the Antenne 2 morning show Télématin, hosted by William Leymergie. He then became Deputy Editor-in-Chief of France 2 while simultaneously working in oncology. He contributed to the popularization of medicine on television, where he worked for 33 years. On 7 October 2018, he announced on his Twitter account that he would be retiring from France 2 at the end of the month. He was occasionally criticized for his comments on unjustified medical acts.

Flaysakier died of heart failure in Les Sables-d'Olonne on 7 October 2021 at the age of 70.

Publication
Santé publique et responsabilité des médias (1997)

References

1951 births
2021 deaths
French television journalists
University of Tours alumni
Harvard School of Public Health alumni
Writers from Tours, France
French physicians